Vovinam competitions at the 2021 Southeast Asian Games took place at Sóc Sơn District Sporting Hall in Hanoi, Vietnam from 18 to 22 May 2022.

Medal table

Medalists

Performance

Men

Women

Fighting

Men

Women

References

Vovinam